Opico (or San Juan Opico) is a municipality in the La Libertad department of El Salvador.

It is located 42 kilometers from San Salvador, capital of the republic. The municipality has an area of 218 km² and a population of 74,280 inhabitants; according to the 2007 census it is ranked No. 13 in population.

Within its territory are pre-Columbian archaeological sites like Joya de Cerén and San Andrés and a church built in the colonial era.

History
Opico was established as an Indian village in 1572 and received the title of town in 1881.

Administrative divisions
It has 27 cantons:
San Jose la Cueva, Talcualuya, El Castillo, Buena Vista, Nombre de Dios, San Antonio, San Pedro Martir, Tehuicho, Barranca Honda, Los Amates, Pitichorro, Nueva Encarnación, Chantusnene, San Nicolás Encarnación, Minas de Plomo, San Pedro Oriente, San Felipe, Los Encuentros, Agua Escondida, Lomas de Santiago, Joya de Ceren, Sitio del Niño, Chanmico, Matazano, Sitio Grande, El Jabali, Las Delicias, and Las Granadillas.

Sports
The local football club is named Juventud Independiente and it played in the Salvadoran Premier Division after being promoted in Summer 2011. Now they play in the second division. They play their home games at the Complejo Municipal.

External links 
Municipal website

Municipalities of the La Libertad Department (El Salvador)